The 4th Marine Logistics Group (4th MLG) is a reserve logistics unit of the United States Marine Corps.  The group is headquartered at New Orleans, Louisiana while its subordinate units are spread across the United States.

Mission
Provide general and direct support and sustained combat service support above the organic capabilities of the support element of the Marine Air-Ground Task Force  (MAGTF). These supported units may be in garrison, combat, and/or in separate locations. The MLG will Support the MAGTF in amphibious assaults and subsequent operations ashore

Current units
The 4th Marine Logistics Group (MLG) comprises a Headquarters and Service Battalion along with two Combat Logistics Regiments (CLR), each CLR contains two Combat Logistics Battalions. 4th MLG also contains an Engineer Support Battalion, a Medical Battalion, and a Dental Battalion:
Headquarters and Service Battalion (HSB)
 Combat Logistics Regiment 4 (CLR 4)
 Combat Logistics Battalion 23 (CLB 23)
 Combat Logistics Battalion 453 (CLB 453)
 Combat Logistics Regiment 45 (CLR 45)
 Combat Logistics Battalion 25 (CLB 25)
 Combat Logistics Battalion 451 (CLB 451)
 6th Engineer Support Battalion (6th ESB)
 4th Medical Battalion
 4th Dental Battalion

History
On 6 February 1966, the Headquarters of the 4th Force Service Support Regiment was activated at the Armed Forces Reserve Center in Midland, Texas. During January 1968, the headquarters relocated to the Marine Reserve Training Center, Orlando, Florida. The headquarters again relocated to the Navy and Marine Corps Reserve Training Center, Atlanta, Georgia during 1971. In May 1976, the unit was redesignated the 4th Force Service Support Group, Fleet Marine Force. In January 1987, the headquarters relocated to Marietta, Georgia. The flag of the 4th FSSG was moved to its present site in New Orleans in February 1992.

See also

 Organization of the United States Marine Corps
List of United States Marine Corps logistics groups

References

This article includes text in the public domain from the United States Marine Corps.

External links
 4th MLG's official website